Enoki can refer to:
 Enokitake (mushroom)
 Enoki Films
 , a class of destroyers in the Imperial Japanese Navy
 , lead ship of the class
 Hiroyuki Enoki
 Yasukuni Enoki (榎 泰邦), Japanese diplomat
 Enoki Irqittuq
 Takatomo Enoki, Japanese engineer
 Junya Enoki, Japanese voice actor
 Enoki surface
 The Enoki family in the manga series Baby and Me